Elections to the Volksraad were held in the Dutch East Indies in 1939. Only ten percent of the population was allowed to vote, but this was only to choose 937 electors, who together with another 515 government appointees, in turn elected 38 of the 60 members. The remainder were appointed directly by the colonial government.

Members

References

Elections in Indonesia
Dutch East
1939 in the Dutch East Indies